Kemtuik (Kamtuk) is a Papuan language of Kemtuk and Kemtuk Gresi Districts, Jayapura Regency, Indonesia. It is very close to Gresi. It is spoken in Aib, Aimbe, Braso, Mamda, Mamdayawang, Meikari, Merem, Sabeyap, Sabeyap Kecil, Sabron Yaru, Sabransamon, Sekorup, and Yanim villages.

References

Nimboran languages
Languages of western New Guinea